Pink Ludoos is a 2004 film directed by Gaurav Seth, about a Sikh family in Canada, dealing with gender and caste issues. It stars Jay Kazim as Gugan, a rebellious daughter resisting an arranged marriage, and Shaheen Khan as her mother.

Reception 
In a Variety review Dennis Harvey said "If imitation is flattery, the most fawning movie in recent memory must be “Pink Ludoos,” a feel-good Canadian pic that pilfers shamelessly from so many sources (especially recent Indo-Anglo comedies like “Monsoon Wedding”) that there isn't an authentic moment in sight."

References

External links
 
 'Pink Ludoos' for Girls
 Pink Ludoos (2004) - Memorable quotes

2004 films
2004 comedy-drama films
Canadian comedy-drama films
Films about Indian Canadians
English-language Canadian films
English-language Indian films
Films about race and ethnicity
Films by Desi directors
Films shot in Vancouver
2004 comedy films
2004 drama films
2000s Canadian films